Platform 0 is a platform number at various railway stations around the world. It is usually a result of constructing a new platform next to the existing platform 1. To avoid having to renumber and replace signage for all other platforms, as well as confusing passengers who are familiar with the existing platform layout, the new platform is simply named "Platform 0" in an example of zero-based numbering.

Examples

United Kingdom
The following stations in the United Kingdom have a Platform 0; this is not necessarily an exhaustive list:
 Cardiff Central
 Doncaster
 Edinburgh Haymarket
 Gravesend
Leeds
London King's Cross
Rainham
Redhill
Stockport

Australia
Lidcombe

Japan
Ayase
Haruda
Hashioka
Kyōto

Switzerland
Aarau

Spain
Platform 0 in Madrid is not a railway platform, but the Madrid Metro's railway museum at the former Chamberí metro station.

References

See also
Platform 9¾

Railway platforms
0 (number)